The Hit Sounds of Simon and Garfunkel was a "Cash-In" Simon and Garfunkel album released in 1967 (see 1967 in music) by Pickwick Records. The label decided that it would capitalize on the duo's newfound fame by releasing this album, consisting of ten tracks recorded from the late 1950s and early 1960s while the duo still called themselves Tom and Jerry. Simon and Garfunkel sued Pickwick because the company was presenting the music as recently recorded material. Pickwick eventually withdrew the album from the market.

Track listing

Side 1

"Hey School Girl" (2:15)
"Our Song" (2:25)
"That's My Story" (2:33)
"Teen Age Fool" (2:47)
"Tia-Juana Blues" (2:32)

Side 2

"Dancin' Wild" (2:17)
"Don't Say Goodbye (2:00)
"Two Teen Agers" (2:25)
"True or False" (2:09)
"Simon Says" (2:34)

Simon & Garfunkel compilation albums
1967 greatest hits albums
Pickwick Records compilation albums